Huangbei may refer to:
Huangbei Subdistrict, Luohu, Shenzhen, Guangdong, China
Huangbei, Meizhou, town in Xining City, Meizhou, Guangdong, China
Huangbei, village in Xiaohe, Liuyang, Hunan, China